Baklanye is a rural locality (a selo) in Vatazhensky Selsoviet, Krasnoyarsky District, Astrakhan Oblast, Russia. The population was 581 as of 2010. There are 5 streets.

Geography 
Baklanye is located 35 km southeast of Krasny Yar (the district's administrative centre) by road. Dolginsky is the nearest rural locality.

References 

Rural localities in Krasnoyarsky District, Astrakhan Oblast